The British Museum algorithm is a general approach to finding a solution by checking all possibilities one by one, beginning with the smallest. The term refers to a conceptual, not a practical, technique where the number of possibilities is enormous.

Newell, Shaw, and Simon 
called this procedure the British Museum algorithm 
"... since it seemed to them as sensible as placing monkeys in front of typewriters in order to reproduce all the books in the British Museum."

See also  
 Bogosort
 Branch and bound
 Breadth-first search 
 Brute-force search

Sources 
.

References

Algorithms
Algorithm